Navia cardonae is a species of plant in the genus Navia. This species is endemic to Venezuela.

References

cardonae
Flora of Venezuela